Byfield is a village (also referred to as a "parish") in the town of Newbury, in Essex County, Massachusetts, United States. It borders West Newbury, Georgetown, and Rowley. It is located about 30 miles north-northeast of Boston, along Interstate 95, about 10 miles south of the border between New Hampshire and Massachusetts.  The ZIP Code for Byfield is 01922.

Byfield was also the home of Governor William Dummer. The village post office was established January 11, 1826 with Benjamin Colman as the first postmaster.

The village consists of mainly residential homes with a few local businesses. It also contains the Newbury town library and Triton Regional High School, which serves three towns (Salisbury, Rowley and Newbury), Adelynrood Retreat & Conference Center run by the Society of the Companions of the Holy Cross as well as the prep school The Governor's Academy (previously known as Governor Dummer Academy after William Dummer, one of the founders of the Newbury area). An arts center and Pearson's deer farm are also located in Byfield.

A festival called "Byfield Days" takes place during the first weekend in June, including the crowning of Miss Byfield and a woodsmen's contest.

Name
Byfield was named after Judge Byfield, who donated the bell to the Byfield Parish Church.

Notable places
 

Governor's Academy located on William Dummer's estate.

In popular culture
The short story "Snowball," by mystery writer Ursula Curtiss, takes place in Byfield.

References

Further reading

External links
 Adelynrood Retreat & Conference Center
 The Governor's Academy
 Byfield Community Arts Center
 Triton Regional School District
 Town Website

Newbury, Massachusetts
Villages in Essex County, Massachusetts
Villages in Massachusetts